In the modern world, Greeks names are the personal names among people of Greek language and culture generally consist of a given name and a family name.

History
Ancient Greeks generally had a single name, often qualified with a patronymic, a clan or tribe, or a place of origin. Married women were identified by the name of their husbands, not their fathers.

Hereditary family names or surnames began to be used by elites in the Byzantine period. Well into the 9th century, they were rare. But by the 11th and 12th centuries, elite families often used family names. Family names came from placenames, nicknames, or occupations.

During the Ottoman period, surnames with Turkish prefixes such as "Hatzi-", "Kara-" and suffixes such as "-(i)lis", "-tzis", and "-oglou"  became common, especially among Anatolian Greeks. It is not clear when stable family surnames became widely used. Though elite families often had stable family names, many of the "last names" used by Greeks into the 19th century were either patronymics or nicknames. It is also possible that family names were simply not recorded because Ottoman administrative practice preferred patronymics, and did not require surnames.

In the 19th century, patronymic surnames became common.

For personal names, from the first century CE until the nineteenth century CE, pagan names from antiquity were mostly replaced by names from Christian scriptures and tradition. With the Modern Greek Enlightenment and the development of Greek nationalism, names from antiquity became popular again.

Family names may be patronymic in origin or else based on occupation, location, or personal characteristic. These origins are often indicated by prefixes or suffixes. Traditionally a woman used a feminine version of her father's family name, replacing it with a feminine version of her husband's family name on marriage. In modern Greece, a woman keeps her father's family name for life but may use a husband's name.

Given names
Until the late 18th century, almost all Christian Greeks were named for Orthodox saints from the Old and New Testaments and early Christian tradition. Since then, names of both deities and mortals from antiquity have been popular as well.

Male names usually end in -ας, -ης, and -ος, but sometimes ancient forms are also used. Female names almost always end in -α and -η, though a few end in -ώ with -ου being possible.

Since antiquity, there has been a strong tradition of naming the first and second sons after the paternal and maternal grandfathers and the first and second daughters after the paternal and maternal grandmothers.

This results in a continuation of names in the family line, but cousins with the same official name are almost always called by different shortened forms or diminutives. The French and German Wikipedias have detailed lists of Greek given names showing the widespread use of shortened forms and diminutives and shortened forms of diminutives in addition to the rarely used formal forms of the sometimes official Demotic Greek forms. These lists are understandable even if one doesn't understand German or French. These variants make it possible to differentiate between cousins despite these traditionally having the same official names because they are traditionally named after their grandparents.

There is a strong clustering of first names by locality according to patron saints, famous churches, or monasteries. Examples include:
 Spyridon and Spyridoula in Corfu
 Gerasimos in Kefalonia
 Dionysios and Dionysia in Zakynthos, 
 Andreas and Andriani or Androulla in Patras and the rest of Achaea province, as well as Cyprus
 Markos and Markella in Chios
 Savvas for those descended from Asia Minor
 Emmanuel or Manolis, Iosif (Joseph) or Sifis, Manousos, and Minas in Crete
 Tsambikos or Tsampika/Mika in Rhodes.
 Stratis or Stratoula and Taxiarchis or Taxiarchoula in Lesbos.
When Greek names are used in other languages, they are sometimes rendered phonetically, such as Eleni for Ἑλένη, and sometimes by their equivalents, like Helen in English or Hélène in French. The Vasiliki (Βασιλική) is Basilica in Italian or Basilique in French. In the United States, there are also conventional anglicizations based on phonetic similarity rather than etymology, for example James or Jimmy for Δημήτρης/Dimitris (nickname Ντίμης/Dimi, hence Jimmy), despite the English name James and its diminutive Jimmy actually coming from Greek Ἰάκωβος Iakobos, English Jacob (through Vulgar Latin Iacomus from Latin Iacobus, which is the Latinized form of Ἰάκωβος Iakobos in the Vulgar Latin and originally Greek New Testament).

Family names 

Greek family names are most commonly patronymics but may also be based on occupation, personal characteristics or location. The feminine version is usually the genitive of the family name of the woman's father or husband; so, for example, Mr. Yannatos and Mrs. Yannatou.

As a result of their codification in the Modern Greek state, surnames have Katharevousa forms even though Katharevousa is no longer the official standard. Thus, the Ancient Greek name Eleutherios forms the Modern Greek proper name Lefteris. In the past, people in speaking used the family name followed by the given name, so John Eleutherios was called Leftero-giannis. In modern practice he is called Giannis Eleftheriou, where Giannis is the popular form of the formal Ioannis but Eleftheriou is an archaic genitive. For women the surname is usually a Katharevousa genitive of a male name, whereas back in Byzantine times there were separate feminine forms of male surnames, such as Palaiologína for Palaiológos which nowadays would be Palaiológou.

In the past, women would change their surname on first marrying to that of their husband in the genitive case, so marking the change of dependence to husband from father. In early Modern Greek society, women were named with -aina as a feminine suffix on the husband's given name, for example "Giorgaina" signifying "wife of George". Nowadays, a woman's surname does not change upon marriage but she can use the husband's surname socially. Children usually receive the paternal surname, though some children receive the maternal surname in addition or exclusively.

Patronymic and matronymic
The use of the patronymic as part of a personal name in everyday language is scarce and virtually non-existent, unlike languages with Eastern Slavic naming customs. It is used in lieu of the father's full name and it is inserted between a person's given name and surname. The use of the matronymic is even more rare.

In a dated, self-styling practice, if Ioannis Papadopoulos has a daughter named Maria and a son named Andreas , they will be referred to as María Ioánnou Papadopoúlou and Andréas Ioánnou Papadópoulos. If Mary then marries George Demetriádes, she may retain her maiden name or choose to be styled María Geōrgíou Demetriádou. If she is widowed, she will revert to her father's patronymic but retain her husband's surname to become María Ioánnou Demetriádou. This largely obsolete styling practice is not reflected in official documents or the spoken language, but could be utilized by, e.g. authors or anyone who uses his/her name for business purposes.

Official documents 
The foremost-and compulsory-identification document in Greece, the Greek identity card, includes name information as follows:

 Surname (Επώνυμο)
 Given name(s) (Όνομα)
 Father's name (Όνομα Πατέρα)
 Father's surname (Επώνυμο Πατέρα)
 Mother's name (Όνομα Μητέρας)
 Mother's surname (Επώνυμο Μητέρας)

Out of the six fields, only the first three are  transliterated in English per ELOT 743/ISO 843. The first two comprise the personal name and the rest is just identity information. The Cypriot identity card also includes father's and mother's name and surname in Greek and English; however all fields are transliterated.

In other significant identity documents, like the Greek passport and Greek driving license, compliant to European standards, the mother's and father's names are completely omitted. Corresponding documents in Cyprus omit them as well.

In other official documents in Greece, like, exempli gratia, a marriage certificate, names are included accordingly (Surname/Given Names/Father's Name/Father's Surname/Mother's Name/Mother's Surname).

In education

In report cards and the Apolytirion, the students' names are displayed as "(student's full name) of (father's full name) and (mother's full name)".

However, in universities and specifically university degrees, the practice varies. For example, university degrees of the Aegean University displays graduates' names as "(student's surname and name) of (father's given name)", whilst degrees from the University of West Attica display both the patronymic and the matronymic.

Examples of given names

Ancient names 

Acamas (Ἀκάμας)
Achaeus (Ἀχαιός)
Achilles (Ἀχιλλεύς)
Adonis (Ἄδωνις)
Aeneas (Αἰνείας)
Agamemnon (Αγαμέμνων)
Agathocles (Ἀγαθοκλῆς)
Agenor (Ἀγήνωρ)
Alcaeus (Ἀλκαῖος)
Alcibiades (Ἀλκιβιάδης)
Alcman (Ἀλκμάν)
Alcyone (Ἀλκυόνη)
Alexander (Ἀλέξανδρος)
Amalia (Αμαλία)
Amyntas (Ἀμύντας)
Amymone (Αμυμώνη)
Anacreon (Ἀνακρέων)
Anaximandros (Ἀναξίμανδρος)
Antenor (Ἀντήνωρ)
Antiochus (Ἀντίoχoς)
Androcles (Ἀνδροκλῆς)
Andromache (Ἀνδρομάχη)
Andronicus (Ἀνδρόνικος)
Andromeda (Ἀνδρομέδα)
Antigone (Ἀντιγόνη)
Aphrodite (Ἀφροδίτη)
Amphitryon (Αμφιτρύων)
Amphitrite (Αμφιτρίτη)
Apollonius (Ἀπολλώνιος)
Arcesilaus (Ἀρκεσίλαος)
Archelaus (Ἀρχέλαος)
Archelochus (Ἀρχέλοχος)
Archimedes (Ἀρχιμήδης)
Arete (Ἀρήτη)
Argus (Ἀργός)
Ariadne (Ἀριάδνη)
Aristarchus (Ἀρίσταρχος)
Aristides (Ἀριστείδης)
Aristippus (Ἀρίστιππος)
Aristo (Ἀρίστων)
Aristocles (Ἀριστοκλῆς)
Aristophanes (Ἀριστοφάνης)
Aristotle (Ἀριστοτέλης)
Artemis (Ἄρτεμις)
Arion (Ἀρίων)
Aspasia (Ἀσπασία)
Athena (Ἀθηνᾶ)
Athenodoros (Ἀθηνόδωρος)
Atreus (Ἀτρεύς)
Berenice (Βερενίκη)
Calchas (Κάλχας)
Calliope (Καλλιόπη)
Callirrhoe (Καλλιρρόη)
Cassandra (Κασσάνδρα)
Cassiopeia (Κασσιόπεια)
Chryses (Χρύσης)
Cleanthes (Κλεάνθης)
Cleopatra (Κλεοπάτρα)
Clio (Κλειώ)
Clymenus (Κλύμενος)
Clytaemnestra (Κλυταιμνήστρα)
Coön (Κόων)
Creon (Κρέων)
Crino (Κρινώ)
Daedalus (Δαίδαλος)
Danaë (Δανάη)
Daphne (Δάφνη)
Demeter (Δημήτηρ)
Democritus (Δημόκριτος)
Demoleon (Δημολέων)
Demosthenes (Δημοσθένης)
Despina (Δέσποινα)
Diocles (Διοκλῆς)
Diodorus (Διόδωρος)
Diogenes (Διογένης)
Diomedes (Διομήδης)
Dionysios (Διονύσιος)
Dionysus  (Διόνυσος)
Dione (Διώνη) 
Electra (Ἡλέκτρα)
Empedocles (Ἐμπεδοκλῆς)
Epictetus (Ἐπίκτητος)
Epicurus (Ἐπίκουρος)
Eratosthenes (Ἐρατοσθένης)
Eteocles (Ἐτεοκλῆς)
Euclid (Εὐκλείδης)
Eucratides (Εὐκρατίδης)
Euripides (Εὐριπίδης)
Europa (Εὐρώπη)
Eurydice (Εὐρυδίκη)
Eurymachus (Εὐρύμαχος)
Euthydemus (Εὐθύδημος)
Euthymia (Εὐθυμία)
Gaea (Γαῖα)
Glaucus (Γλαῦκος)
Gorgias (Γοργίας)
Harmonia (Ἁρμονία)
Hector (Ἕκτωρ)
Helen (Ἑλένη)
Helianthe (Ἡλιάνθη)
Helicaon (Ἑλικάων)
Heliodorus (Ἡλιόδωρος)
Hera (Ἥρα)
Heracles (Ἡρακλῆς)
Hermes (Ἑρμῆς)
Hermione (Ἑρμιόνη)
Herodotus (Ἡρόδοτος)
Hesiod (Ἡσίοδος)
Hippocrates (Ἱπποκράτης)
Hippolyta (Ἱππολύτη)
Hippolytus (Ἱππόλυτος)
Homer (Ὅμηρος)
Hyacinth (Ὑάκινθος)
Hypatia (Ὑπατία)
Ianthe (Ἰάνθη)
Icarus (Ἴκαρος)
Idomeneus (Ἰδομενεύς)
Ino (Ἰνώ)
Ion (Ἴων)
Iphidamas (Ἰφιδάμας)
Iphigenia (Ἰφιγένεια)
Irene/Irini (Εἰρήνη)
Isioni (Ησιόνη)
Ismene (Ἰσμήνη)
Jason (Ἰάσων)
Jocasta (Ἰοκάστη)
Kyveli (Κυβέλη)
Laodamas (Λαοδάμας)
Laodice (Λαοδίκη)
Leonidas (Λεωνίδας)
Leto (Λητώ)
Lycurgus (Λυκοῦργος)
Medea (Μήδεια)
Melpomene (Μελπομένη)
Menander (Μένανδρος)
Menelaus (Μενέλαος)
Metrodorus (Μητρόδωρος)
Miltiades (Μιλτιάδης)
Myron (Μύρων)
Myrto (Μυρτώ)
Myrtali (Μυρτάλη)
Nauplius (Ναύπλιος)
Nafsimedon (Ναυσιμέδων)
Narcissus (Νάρκισσος)
Neoptolemus (Νεοπτόλεμος)
Nestor (Νέστωρ)
Nefeli (Νεφέλη)
Nicander (Νίκανδρος)
Nicanor (Nικάνωρ)
Nicodemus (Νικόδημος)
Nike (Νίκη)
Nikolaos (Νικόλαος)
Oceanus (Ὠκεανός)
Odysseus (Ὀδυσσεύς)
Oedipus (Οἰδίπους)
Olympias (Ὀλυμπιάς)
Orestis (Ὀρέστης)
Orpheus (Ὀρφεύς)
Pandora (Πανδώρα)
Pantaleon (Πανταλέων)
Paris (Πάρις)
Patroclus (Πάτροκλος)
Pausanias (Παυσανίας)
Pegasus (Πήγασος)
Peleus (Πηλεύς)
Penelope (Πηνελόπη)
Pericles (Περικλῆς)
Phaedon (Φαίδων)
Pheidias or Phidias (Φειδίας)
Philippos (Φίλιππος)
Philoctetes (Φιλοκτήτης)
Philon (Φίλων)
Phoebe (Φοίβη)
Phyllis (Φυλλίς)
Pindar (Πίνδαρος)
Plato (Πλάτων)
Polemon (Πολέμωνος)
Polybus (Πόλυβος)
Polynices (Πολυνείκης)
Polybios (Πολύβιος)
Priam (Πρίαμος)
Prometheus (Προμηθέας)
Ptolemy (Πτολεμαῖος)
Pythagoras (Πυθαγόρας)
Pyrrhus (Πύρρος)
Rhea (Ῥέα)
Selene (Σελήνη)
Seleucus (Σέλευκος)
Simonides (Σιμωνίδης)
Socrates (Σωκράτης)
Sofia (Σοφία)
Solon (Σόλων)
Sophocles (Σοφοκλῆς)
Strato (Στράτων)
Talthybius (Ταλθύβιος)
Telemachus (Τηλέμαχος)
Tethys (Τηθύς)
Thaleia (Θάλεια)
Theano (Θεανώ)
Thekla (Θέκλα)
Themistocles (Θεμιστοκλῆς)
Theodoros (Θεόδωρος)
Theophrastus (Θεόφραστος)
Theseus (Θησεύς)
Thestor (Θέστωρ)
Thetis (Θέτις)
Thraso (Θράσων)
Thrasybulus (Θρασύβουλος)
Thrasymachus (Θρασύμαχος)
Thucydides (Θουκυδίδης)
Urania (Οὐρανία)
Uranus (Οὐρανός)
Xanthippe (Ξανθίππη)
Xenocrates (Ξενοκράτης)
Xenophon (Ξενοφῶν)
Zeno (Ζήνων)

Biblical and Christian names 

Aikaterine (Αἰκατερίνη)
Alexios  (Ἀλέξιος)
Alice (Αλίκη)
Ananias (Ἀνανίας)
Anastasios (Ἀναστάσιος)
Αrgie (Αργυρώ)
Andreas (Ἀνδρέας)
Angelos (Άγγελος)
Angie (Αγγελική)
Anna (Ἄννα)
Anthimos (Ἄνθιμος)
Antonios (Ἀντώνιος)
Athanasios (Ἀθανάσιος)
Agnes (Αγνή)
Barbara (Βαρβάρα)
Bartholomaios (Βαρθολομαῖος)
Vassileios/Vassilios (Βασίλειος)
Vasiliki (Βασιλική)
Victoria (Βικτώρια / Βικτωρία)
Calliope (Καλλιόπη)
Charalambos (Χαράλαμπος)
Christianos (Χριστιανός)
Christina (Χριστίνα)
Christoforos (Χριστόφορος)
Christos (Χρίστος)
Damianos (Δαμιανός)
Daniel (Δανιήλ)
David (Δαβίδ)
Dimitrios (Δημήτριος)
Despina (Δέσποινα)
Dioscoros (Διόσκουρος)
Dorothea (Δωροθέα)
Eleutherius (Ελευθέριος)
Eleni (Ἑλένη)
Elias (Ἠλίας)
Elizabeth (Ἐλισάβετ)
Emmanouil (Εμμανουήλ)
Erastus (Ἔραστος)
Erotokritos (Ερωτόκριτος)
Eudocia (Εὐδοκία)
Evgenia (Εὐγενία)
Eusebius (Εὐσέβιος)
Eva (Εύα)
Evangelos (Εὐάγγελος)
Eve (Εύη)
Gabriel (Γαβριήλ)
Georgios (Γεώργιος)
Grigorios (Γρηγόριος)
Irene (Εἰρήνη)
Isaakios (Ισαάκιος)
 Isaac (Ισαάκ)
Isaias (Ἠσαΐας)
Iakovos (Ἰάκωβος)
Ieremias (Ἱερεμίας)
Joachim (Ἰωακείμ)
Ioannis (Ἰωάννης)
Jonah (Ἰωνᾶς)
Joseph (Ἰωσήφ)
Josephine (Ιωσηφίνα)
Ioulia (Ιουλία)
Konstantinos (Κωνσταντῖνος)
Kyrillos (Κύριλλος)
Lazarus (Λάζαρος)
Lambros (Λάμπρος)
Lavrentios (Λαυρέντιος)
Leo (Λέων)
 Leonidas (Λεωνίδας)
Loukas (Λουκᾶς)
Loukia (Λουκία)
Lucian (Λουκιανός)
Lydia (Λυδία)
Magdalene (Μαγδαληνή)
 Magnolia (Μανώλια)
 Makarios (Μακάριος)
Mania (Μάνια)
 Margaret (Μαργαρίτα)
Maria (Μαρία)
Marianos/Mariannos (Μαριάννος)
Marianna (Μαριάννα)
Markos (Μάρκος)
 Marcellus (Μάρκελος)
 Marcellα (Μαρκέλλα)
Martha (Μάρθα)
Marianthi (Μαριάνθη)
Matthaios (Ματθαῖος)
Melina (Μελίνα)
Michael (Μιχαήλ/Μιχάλης)
Moses (Μωϋσῆς)
Nectarius (Νεκτάριος)
Nicanor (Nικάνωρ)
Nicodemus (Νικόδημος)
Nicolaos (Νικόλαος)
 Nicole (Νικολέτα)
Niketas (Νικήτας)
Nikephoros (Νικηφόρος)
Pagona (Παγώνα)
Panayiotis (Παναγιώτης)
Panteleimon/Pantelis (Παντελεήμων)
 Paraskeve (Παρασκευή)
Pavlos (Παῦλος)
 Pavlina (Παυλίνα)
 Polina (Πωλίνα)
Petros (Πέτρος)
Philemon (Φιλήμων)
Procopios (Προκόπιος)
Raphael (Ραφαήλ)
Raphaelia (Ραφαηλία)
Rigas (Ρήγας)
Rovértos (Ροβέρτος)
Savvas (Σάββας)
Sakellarios (Σακελλαριος)
Sarah (Σάρα)
Sergios (Σέργιος)
Silas (Σίλας)
Simeon (Συμεών)
Solomon (Σολομών)
Sofia (Σοφία)
Spyridon (Σπυρίδων)
Staurakios (Σταυράκιος)
Staikos (Σταϊκος)
Stavros (Σταῦρος)
Stacy (Αναστασία)
Stefanos (Στέφανος)
Stylianos (Στυλιανός/Στέλιος)
Thaddeus (Θαδδαῖος)
Theofilos (Θεόφιλος)
Thomas (Θωμάς)
Timotheos (Τιμόθεος)
Zacharias (Ζαχαρίας)
Zoe (Ζωή)

Mixed names 
 Marina / Ellie (Μαρινέλλη)
 Marios / Ioannis (Μαριάννος)
 Maria / Vasiliki (Μαριβάσια)
 Maria / Anthi (Μαριάνθη)
 Maria / Eleni (Μαριλένα / Μαριαλένα)
 Maria / Anna (Μαριάννα)
 Eleni / Anna (Ελεάννα)
 Vasileia / Anna (Βασιλειάννα)
 Vasiliki / Anna (Βασιλιάννα)
 Vasileia / Elina (Βασιλείνα)
 Vasiliki / Elina (Βασιλίνα)
 Georgia / Anna (Γεωργιάννα)
 Christina / Anna (Χριστιάννα)
  Ilia / Anna (Ηλιάννα)
  Louiza / Anna (Λουιζάννα)
  Louiza / Ioanna (Λουιζιάννα)
 Chrysa / Anthi (Χρυσάνθη)

Diminutive names

Anastasia (Αναστασούλα, Νατάσσα, Τασούλα, Τασσώ, Τασία, Σία, Σίσσυ)

Aggeliki (Αγγελικό, Αγγελικούλα, Αγγέλλω, Αγγέλα,  Άντζελα, Άτζελα, Άντζυ, Γκέλυ)

Maria (Μαρούλα, Μάρω, Μαράκι, Μαριώ, Μάρα, Μάϊρα, Μαρίκα, Μαίρη) 

Vasiliki (Βασιλικό, Βασιλικούλα, Βάσω, Βασίλω, Βάσια, Βασούλα, Βίκυ.)

Panagiota (Γιώτα, Πέννυ, Πέγκυ)

Emmanouella (Εμμανουηλία, Εμμανουέλα, Μανουέλα, Μανώλια, Μανωλία, Μανώλα)

Konstantina (Ντίνα, Ναντίνα, Νάντια, Κωστούλα)

Paraskeve (Παρασκευούλα, Εύη, Βιβή, Εβίτα, Βούλα)

Athena (Νανά, Νίνα)

Victoria (Βίκο)

Georgia (Γεωργούλα, Γιωργούλα, Γιωργίτσα, Γιωργία, Γωγώ, Ζέτα, Τζίνα)

Pagona (Πένυ, Πέγκυ)

Dionysia (Διώνη, Διόνη, Διονυσούλα, Ντένη, Ντένια)

Foteini (Φώτω, Φώφη, Φωτούλα, Φαίη, Φωφώ)

Vasileia (Σίλεια)

Kyriaki (Κική, Κυριακούλα, Κούλα)

Similar names

Valeria / Violeta

Daphne / Danae

Examples of family names

Common prefixes

 
 Archi-: meaning "superior" or "boss".
 Chondro-: meaning "fat".
 Gero-: meaning "old" or "wise".
 Hadji-: the Arabic honorific for one who has made the Hadj or pilgrimage, used in the case of Christians for a voyage to Jerusalem, for example "Hatzipanagis".
 Kara-: from the Turkish word for "black",<ref>[https://web.archive.org/web/20100602050058/http://www.fredonia.edu/faculty/emeritus/EdwinLawson/GreekNames/Greek_10-22-09_Final.pdf Greek Personal Names], Central Intelligence Agency, revised and updated by Anastasia Parianou, 2007.</ref> for example "Karatasos".
 Konto-: meaning "short".
 Makro-: meaning "tall" or "long". 
 Mastro-: meaning "artisan" or "workman".
 Palaio-: meaning "old" or "wise".
 Papa-: indicating descent from a papas, a priest. So Papakostas is the "son of Kostas, the priest".

Common suffixes

 -akis (-άκης): associated primarily with Crete (except Anogeia)  and the Aegean Islands, it is a diminutive, such as Giorgos becoming Giorgakis for the young Giorgos. Examples are: "Mitsotakis", "Theodorakis" and "Doukakis".This suffix was also very common for Cretan Turks up until they were officially changed with the Surname Law. This suffix was introduced in the 19th century.
 -akos (-ᾶκος): mainly from Laconia, particularly among Maniots from the Laconian part of the Mani peninsula.' Examples are: "Xarhakos" and "Kyrgiakos".
 -oulis (-ούλης): mainly from Thessalia, it is a diminutive, which is also used as a diminutive for place names in the region such as Giannouli and Damasouli .' Examples are: "Georgoulis" and "Giannoulis".
 -as (-ᾶς): from Macedonia and the Epirus. Examples are: "Melas", "Dimas", "Zorbas", "Lekkas", "Moustakas" and "Zappas". However, the surname Dukas or Doukas derives from the Latin title dux or duke.
 -atos (-ᾶτος): (from Cephalonia), of Venetian derivation. Examples are: "Georgatos", "Cosmatos" and "Manatos".
 -eas (-εας): mainly among Maniots from the Messenian part of the Mani peninsula. Examples are: "Koteas", "Georgeas" and "Charisteas".
 -elis (-έλης) and -ilis (-ιλής): from the Turkish suffixes for agent, possession and origin, common in western Asia Minor, Mytiline, Lemnos and Imbros. Examples are: Myrsilis, Katselis, Papadelis, Manelis.
 -allis (-άλλης) and -ellis (-έλλης): both found especially in the Dodecanese, mainly Rhodes. Examples are "Georgallis" and "Kanellis".
The suffix -idis (often transliterated -ides in English and French) is the oldest in use. Zeus, for example, was also referred to as Cronides ("son of Cronus"). -idis was the most common suffix in Byzantium, Bithynia and Byzantine Thrace, being also used by Pontic Greeks and Caucasus Greeks in the Pontic Alps, northeast Anatolia, Georgia, the former Kars Oblast, and sometimes in Epirus, Corfu and some Aegean islands. Examples include: "Stavridis", "Koutoufides", "Angelidis", "Georgiadis".
 -lis (-λής). Turkish suffix for "of" a place, like the Greek suffixes -tis and -otis. Examples are: "Karamanlis" and "Kasdaglis".
 -opoulos (-όπουλος): meaning "descendant of", originated from the Peloponnese but has become very widespread. Examples are: "Stamatelopoulos", "Papadopoulos", "Gianopoulos", "Anagnostopoulos" and "Theodorakopoulos". It can also indicate ethnic origin, such as Frangopoulos (Φραγκόπουλος) meaning "son of a Frank", Persopoulos (Περσόπουλος) meaning "son of a Persian", Servopoulos (Σερβόπουλος) meaning "son of a Serb" and Voulgaropoulos (Βουλγαρόπουλος) meaning "son of a Bulgarian".
 -oglou (-όγλου): from the Turkish -oğlu meaning "son of", seen in families from Asia Minor. Examples are: "Tsolakoglou", "Ardizoglou" and "Patsatzoglou".
 -ou (-ου): a genitive mainly from Cyprus. Examples are: "Afxentiou", "Economou", "Konstantinou", "Christoforou" and "Gregoriou".
 -tis, -otis (-της, -ώτης): meaning "of" a place. Examples are "Politis" from polis (city) and "Chiotis" from Chios.
  (-τζής, -τσής) and feminine (-τζή, -τσή): Turkish suffix to signify a profession, like the English -er in Baker or Butcher''. Examples are: "Devetzi" and "Kouyioumtzis".

See also
Onomastics

References

External links 
 Lexicon of Greek Personal Names, a Major Research Project of the British Academy, Oxford, contains over 35,000 published Greek names up to the 6th century.

Further reading 
 Matthews, Elaine; Hornblower, Simon; Fraser, Peter Marshall, Greek Personal Names: Their Value as Evidence, Proceedings of the British Academy (104), Oxford University Press, 2000. 

Names by culture
Given names
 Surnames
Name
Greek-language given names